Giovanni Battista Marmi (1659–1686) was an Italian painter of the Baroque period. He initially apprenticed with Vincenzo Dandini, then Livio Mehus, then moved to Rome to become a pupil of the painter Ciro Ferri and Giovanni Maria Morandi.

References

External links

1659 births
1686 deaths
17th-century Italian painters
Italian male painters
Painters from Tuscany
Italian Baroque painters